Sytrus is a software synthesizer included in the digital audio workstation FL Studio. Image-Line also released VSTi and DXi versions.

Overview

Features
Sytrus uses a combination of subtractive synthesis, additive synthesis, FM synthesis and ring modulation, thus allowing sounds produced to range from drum sets to organs. Sytrus provides a large number of adjustments and controls, including shape shifting, harmonics editing, EQ, a modulator (which can control almost any parameter), several filters, reverb, delay, unison, detune, etc. CPU usage widely varies, mainly depending on effect settings, number of oscillators, and their settings. The second version of Sytrus (introduced with FL Studio 6), comes with an array of presets covering many types of sounds.

Easter eggs
When clicking on the Sytrus logo in "Show Info", the Hint Bar at the top says "Don't even think about it you fruit-clicking pervert!".  After several more clicks, it will say, "Ok, fruit-clicking pays."  At this stage, the modulator grid changes to green rather than the standard blue.  Then, "There's nothing more, you know..." This has been discontinued as of FL Studio version 20.6.

See also

FL Studio
Image-Line
Software synthesizer
Digital audio workstation

References

Software synthesizers
Pascal (programming language) software